Bernarda Ordoñez Moscoso is an Ecuadorian politician.

Political career 
She was a candidate for the 2021 general election in Azuay Province.

In 2021, she was appointed to the Cabinet of Ecuador as Minister of Justice, with responsibility to lead the Human Rights Secretariat. In April 2022, she resigned from the position.

References 

Living people
Ecuadorian feminists
Ecuadorian human rights activists
21st-century Ecuadorian politicians
21st-century Ecuadorian women politicians
Female justice ministers
Women government ministers of Ecuador
Justice ministers of Ecuador
Year of birth missing (living people)